Badara Sène (born 19 November 1984, in Dakar) is a Senegalese footballer, who most recently played in France for FC Sochaux-Montbéliard.

Career 
He made his Ligue 1 debut on 4 January 2006, PSG 3–1 won FC Sochaux-Montbéliard. On 31 August 2009 Le Mans have signed the Senegalese midfielder on loan from Sochaux for one season.

Whilst at Guingamp, then in Ligue 2, Sène played as a substitute in the 2009 Coupe de France Final in which they beat Rennes.

References

External links

Senegalese footballers
Senegal international footballers
Senegalese expatriate footballers
FC Sochaux-Montbéliard players
En Avant Guingamp players
Le Mans FC players
FC Laufen players
Ligue 1 players
Ligue 2 players
Expatriate footballers in France
Association football midfielders
Footballers from Dakar
1984 births
Living people